Bunagana may refer to:

Bunagana, DRC, a town in North Kivu Province, eastern Democratic Republic of the Congo, at the border with Uganda
Bunagana, Uganda, a town in Kisoro District, southwestern Uganda, at the border with the Democratic Republic of the Congo